Sampo Karjalainen (born May 2, 1977) is one of the original founders of Sulake and Habbo Hotel, an online social networking video game aimed at teenagers. Sampo has also been in other projects, including Bobba Bar for iPhone. Karjalainen is now the designer, chief executive officer, and co-founder of ProtoGeo Inc., the creators of the Moves fitness tracker app for iOS.

Projects 
1994: To the Point
1998: Satama Interactive
2000: Ego Taivas media lab
2000: Sulake

References 

1977 births
Finnish computer programmers
Finnish businesspeople
Living people
Habbo